The 2012 Junior Pan American Rhythmic Gymnastics Championships was held in Córdoba, Argentina, August 28–September 2, 2012.

Medal summary

References

Junior Pan American Rhythmic Gymnastics Championships
Pan American Gymnastics Championships
International gymnastics competitions hosted by Argentina
Junior Pan American Rhythmic Gymnastics Championships
Junior Pan American Rhythmic Gymnastics Championships
Junior Pan American Rhythmic Gymnastics Championships